Jure Balažič (born September 12, 1980) is a Slovenian retired professional basketball player. He is a 204 cm tall power forward position.

Slovenia national team
Balažić was first time called to Slovenia national basketball team in 2012 on prep camp. He made his official debut on Eurobasket 2013, making him the oldest debutant for Slovenia at 31 years, 11 months, and 23 days. He was also member of Slovenia at 2014 FIBA Basketball World Cup. He represented Slovenia at the 2015 EuroBasket where they were eliminated by Latvia in eighth finals.

References

External links

TBLStat.net Profile
Eurocup Profile
Krka profile

1980 births
Living people
ABA League players
APOEL B.C. players
Atomerőmű SE players
Erdemirspor players
Gaziantep Basketbol players
İstanbul Büyükşehir Belediyespor basketball players
KK Krka players
KK Zagreb players
Sportspeople from Novo Mesto
Power forwards (basketball)
Slovenian expatriate sportspeople in Croatia
Slovenian expatriate sportspeople in Cyprus
Slovenian expatriate sportspeople in Hungary
Slovenian expatriate basketball people in Turkey
Slovenian men's basketball players
Basketball players from Ljubljana
Tofaş S.K. players
2014 FIBA Basketball World Cup players